John Henry Hoffecker (September 12, 1827 – June 16, 1900) was an American engineer and politician from Smyrna in Kent County, Delaware. He was a member of the Republican Party, who served as U.S. Representative from Delaware.

Early life and family
Hoffecker was born in Kent County, near Smyrna, Delaware, the son of Joseph and Rachel Van Gasken Hoffecker. He studied civil engineering and entered into that profession in 1853. He married twice, first to Annie E. Appleton, with whom he had four children, Walter, John A., James Edwin, and Annie. He married secondly, Charlotte Jerman, the widow of Joseph H. Hoffecker. She had been a missionary in China from 1875 to 1878.

Political career
Hoffecker was originally a member of the Whig Party, but like so many others, became a Republican in 1856. He was a delegate to the Republican National Convention in 1876 and 1884. He was also president of the Smyrna town council from 1878 until 1898. Elected to the state House in 1888, he served in the 1889/90 session and was chosen Speaker. He ran for governor in 1896 as the candidate of both the Union Republicans (controlled by (J. Edward Addicks), and the National Party (a rival to the Prohibition Party). However, enough votes went to the regular (Anti-Addicks) Republican candidate, John C. Higgins, that Democrat Ebe W. Tunnell was elected.

Hoffecker was elected to the U.S. House of Representatives in 1898, defeating incumbent Democratic U.S. Representative L. Irving Handy. He served in the Republican majority in the 56th Congress. On June 16, 1900, during a visit home from the 1900 Republican National Convention in Philadelphia, Hoffecker suffered a stroke and died. He had served from March 4, 1899, until his death, during the administration of U.S. President William McKinley.

Death and legacy
Hoffecker died at Smyrna and is buried there in the Glenwood Cemetery. His son, Walter O. Hoffecker, was elected to finish his term in the U.S. House.  His home, Ivy Dale Farm, was listed on the National Register of Historic Places in 1973.

Almanac
Elections are held the first Tuesday after November 1. Members of the Delaware General Assembly take office the second Tuesday of January. The State House members have a two-year term. U.S. Representatives took office March 4 and also have a two-year term.

See also
List of United States Congress members who died in office (1900–1949)

References

External links
Biographical Directory of the U.S. Congress
Delaware's Member of Congress
Memorial addresses on the life and character of John H. Hoffecker, late a representative from Delaware delivered in the House of Representatives and Senate frontispiece 1901

The Political Graveyard

Places with information
Delaware Historical Society; website; 505 North Market Street, Wilmington, Delaware 19801; (302) 655-7161
University of Delaware; Library website; 181 South College Avenue, Newark, Delaware 19717; (302) 831-2965
Newark Free Library; 750 Library Ave., Newark, Delaware; (302) 731-7550.
 

1827 births
1900 deaths
People from Smyrna, Delaware
Republican Party members of the Delaware House of Representatives
Burials in Kent County, Delaware
Republican Party members of the United States House of Representatives from Delaware
19th-century American politicians
Engineers from Delaware
19th-century American engineers